Brighton by-election may refer to several by-elections in Brighton, England:

1st–16th Parliaments  of the UK (1801–1857)
 1842 Brighton by-election, won by Lord Alfred Hervey, standing as a Conservative
 1853 Brighton by-election, won by Lord Alfred Hervey, standing as a Peelite

17th–26th Parliaments (1857–1900)
 1860 Brighton by-election, won by James White, Liberal
 1864 Brighton by-election, won by Henry Moor, Conservative
 1884 Brighton by-election, won by William Thackeray Marriott, standing as a Conservative
 1885 Brighton by-election, won by William Thackeray Marriott
 August 1886 Brighton by-election, won by William Thackeray Marriott
 November 1886 Brighton by-election, won by William Tindal Robertson, Conservative
 1889 Brighton by-election, won by Gerald Walter Erskine Loder, Conservative
 1893 Brighton by-election, won by Bruce Canning Vernon-Wentworth, Conservative

27th–35th Parliaments (1900–1931)
 1905 Brighton by-election, won by Ernest Villiers, Liberal
 1911 Brighton by-election, won by John Gordon, Conservative
 1914 Brighton by-election, won by Charles Thomas-Stanford, Conservative

36th–38th Parliaments (1931–1950)
 1940 Brighton by-election, won by Lord Erskine, Conservative
 1941 Brighton by-election, won by Anthony Marlowe, Conservative
 1944 Brighton by-election, won by William Teeling, Conservative

39th–47th Parliaments (1950–1979)
 1969 Brighton Pavilion by-election, won by Julian Amery, Conservative